Constance Dollé (born 1974) is a French actress. She has appeared in more than forty films since 1999.

Selected filmography

References

External links 

1974 births
Living people
French film actresses
Place of birth missing (living people)